Wales is served by four police forces, Dyfed–Powys Police, Gwent Police, North Wales Police and South Wales Police.

List of police forces in Wales

South Wales Police 
South Wales Police is one of the four territorial police forces in Wales. It is headquartered in Bridgend. 

The force was formed as South Wales Constabulary on 1 June 1969, by the amalgamation of the former Glamorgan Constabulary, Cardiff City Police, Swansea Borough Police and Merthyr Tydfil Borough Police. In 1974, with the reorganisation of local government, the force's area was expanded to cover the newly created counties of Mid, South and West Glamorgan. In 1996, the force adopted its current name and lost the Rhymney Valley area to Gwent Police due to further local government reorganisation.

Today, the force serves the principal areas of Bridgend, Cardiff, Merthyr Tydfil, Neath Port Talbot, Rhondda Cynon Taf, Swansea and the Vale of Glamorganmost of the ancient county of Glamorgan.

North Wales Police 

North Wales Police is the territorial police force responsible for policing North Wales. Its headquarters are in Colwyn Bay. , the force has 1,510 police officers, 170 special constables, 182 police community support officers (PCSO), 71 police support volunteers (PSV), and 984 staff.

Dyfed-Powys Police 
Dyfed–Powys Police is the territorial police force in Wales policing Carmarthenshire, Ceredigion and Pembrokeshire (which make up the former administrative area of Dyfed) and the unitary authority of Powys (covering Brecknockshire, Radnorshire and Montgomeryshire). The force was formed in 1968, with the merger of the Carmarthenshire and Cardiganshire Constabulary, the Pembrokeshire Constabulary and the Mid Wales Constabulary.

It includes many remote rural communities and a number of old industrial areas that are currently undergoing significant change and redevelopment. The population is under 500,000, although it is boosted each year with many tourist visitors.

The force's headquarters is in Carmarthen.

, the force had 1,145 police officers, 87 special constables, 143 police community support officers (PCSO), 55 police support volunteers (PSV), and 674 staff.

Gwent Police 

Gwent Police is a territorial police force in Wales, responsible for policing the local authority areas of Blaenau Gwent, Caerphilly, Monmouthshire, Newport and Torfaen.

The force was formed in 1967 by the amalgamation of Monmouthshire Constabulary and Newport Borough Police. In 1974 its area was realigned to cover the new administrative county of Gwent, and in 1996, it was expanded again to cover the former Rhymney Valley district area that had become part of the Caerphilly county borough.

, the force has 1,308 police officers, 70 special constables, 115 police community support officers (PCSO), 40 police support volunteers (PSV), and 647 staff.

British Transport Police 
The police force on Wales's railways is the Great Britain-wide British Transport Police (BTP).

Proposed all-Wales police force 
In 2022, Dr Richard Lewis, chief constable of Dyfed-Powys Police, called for a Wales-wide police force by 2030. 

The leader of Plaid Cymru, Adam Price, also called in 2022 for the existing four police forces of Wales to unite as one Wales force that could lead to “positive change in outcomes for victims and foster a new policing culture based on respect and inclusivity.” Price also said that Wales could learn from the uniting of police forces of Scotland, “Wales can learn lessons from the success of Police Scotland’s merger in 2013 in order to ensure that resources are distributed fairly and wisely between the regions, and that relations with forces in England remain strong to tackle cross-border crime."

References 

Police forces of Wales
Welsh police authorities